Gabler (or Gäbler) is a surname. Notable people with the surname include:
Christoph August Gabler (1767–1839), German composer
Frank Gabler (1911–1967), American baseball player
Fritz Gäbler (1897–1974), German politician
Gabe Gabler (1930–2014), American baseball player
Johann Philipp Gabler (1753–1826), German Protestant theologian
John Gabler (1930–2009), American baseball player
Josephine Gabler (1879–1961), American physician
Matt Gabler (born 1983), American politician
Mel and Norma Gabler (1915–2014; 1923–2007), American activists
Mike Gabler (born 1970), Winner of Survivor 43
Milt Gabler (1911–2001), American record producer
Neal Gabler (born 1950), American journalist
Roland Gäbler (born 1964), German sailor
Wally Gabler (born 1944), American football player

See also
Hedda Gabler, play by Henrik Ibsen